Mount Britton (originally Mount Britten) is a rural locality in the Isaac Region, Queensland, Australia. In the  Mount Britton had a population of 9 people.

It was formerly a township in the former Nebo Shire.

History 

The township began in 1881 with the discovery of a gold field, and at its height had a population of 1500 inhabitants. When alluvial and shallow reef gold diminished by the late 1880s, the town experienced a decline and was eventually abandoned. It currently exists as a historical site at the end of Mount Britton Road.

Mount Britten Post Office opened on 1 June 1881 and closed in 1912.

Mount Britten Provisional School opened  and closed in 1906.

At the 2006 census, Mount Britton and the surrounding area had a population of 255.

In the  Mount Britton had a population of 9 people.

Education
There are no schools in Mount Britton. The nearest primary school is Nebo State School in neighbouring Nebo to the south. There are no nearby secondary schools; distance education or boarding schools would be options.

See also

 List of ghost towns

References

Further reading

  (includes historical aspects of Mount Britton)

External links

 

Ghost towns in Queensland
Mining towns in Queensland
Populated places established in 1881
1881 establishments in Australia
Isaac Region
Localities in Queensland